The Queen Family Singalong is an American music television special which premiered November 4, 2021 on ABC. Hosted by Darren Criss and spun off from ABC's 2020 specials The Disney Family Singalong, the special featured performances of songs by the British rock band Queen by celebrity guests. The special featured an appearance by Adam Lambert—who performs as lead singer with the band's members as Queen + Adam Lambert. As a salute to the reopening of Broadway theatres amid the COVID-19 pandemic, the special also included a performance of "Don't Stop Me Now" by the Broadway casts of Disney's musicals Aladdin and The Lion King.

Performances

Appearances

Animal

Broadcast
The special was seen by a total of 3.51 million viewers, with a 0.5 share of viewers 18-49; it was the lowest-rated entry in ABC's Family Singalong franchise, with a 58% decline in comparison to November 2020's The Disney Holiday Singalong.

References

External links

2021 television specials
American Broadcasting Company television specials
Queen (band)
Music television specials
Sing-along television shows